NMRW can refer to:
 National Monuments Record of Wales, Welsh archive established by Royal Commission
 National Movement of Rural Women, South African women's organization